Operation Buckland or the Battle of the Argenta Gap (12-19 April 1945) was the Eighth Army’s contribution to the Allied Spring Offensive in Italy, and saw them bypass the last series of river defences facing them and break out into the Po plains.

References
Rickard, J (20 May 2019), Operation Buckland - Battle of the Argenta Gap, 9–19 April 1945,  http://www.historyofwar.org/articles/operation_buckland_argenta.html
https://codenames.info/operation/buckland/

Citations

Italian campaign (World War II)